Motley is a surname which may refer to:

Archibald Motley (1891–1981), African-American painter
Constance Baker Motley (1921–2005), African-American civil rights activist, lawyer, judge, state senator and Manhattan Borough President
Darryl Motley (born 1960), American Major League Baseball player
Eric Motley (born 1972), African-American bureaucrat
Fannie E. Motley (born c. 1938), first African-American to graduate from Spring Hill College in Mobile, Alabama
Geof Motley, former Australian rules football player and coach
James Motley (1822–1859), English engineer and naturalist
John Lothrop Motley (1814–1877), American historian
Johnathan Motley (born 1995), American basketball player
Marion Motley (1920–1999), American National Football League player
Parnell Motley (born 1997), American football player
Peter Motley (born 1964), former Australian rules football player
Ronald Motley (1944–2013), American trial attorney

See also
Motley (disambiguation)